Gangadhara Rama Rao ( – 22 July 1890) was an Indian politician and zamindar of Pittapore in the Madras Presidency who served as a member of the Madras Legislative Council from 1878 to 1881.

Biography 

Gangadhara Rama Rao ascended the throne of Pittapore or Pithapuram in 1877. He established the Pithapuram Raja College in 1884.

References 

 
 Pithapuram

1890 deaths
Members of the Tamil Nadu Legislative Council
Year of birth uncertain
People from East Godavari district